Denis Alexandrovich Smyslov (born 5 January 1979) is a Russian former professional cyclist, who currently works as a directeur sportif for UCI Continental team . He competed in the men's team pursuit at the 2000 Summer Olympics.

References

External links
 

1979 births
Living people
Russian male cyclists
Olympic cyclists of Russia
Cyclists at the 2000 Summer Olympics
Cyclists from Saint Petersburg